Liometopum potamophilum is an extinct species of Miocene ant in the genus Liometopum. Described by Zhang in 1989, the fossils were found in China.

References

†
Fossil taxa described in 1989
Miocene insects
†
Fossil ant taxa